Breton was an English band from London, consisting of lead vocalist and guitarist Roman Rappak, drummer Adam Ainger, programmer Ian Patterson, bassist Daniel McIlvenny, and visual artist Ryan McClarnon.

Rappak and Ainger began playing together around 2007, but the full group did not coalesce until several years later. They envisioned themselves as a multimedia artist collective, working from a former NatWest bank building in Elephant and Castle which they dubbed Breton Labs. The group released three extended plays and did remixes for artists such as Tricky, Alt J, The Temper Trap, Lana Del Rey and Local Natives. The group signed to Fatcat Records in 2011 and released their debut full-length, Other People's Problems, early the following year.

For much of 2012 and 2013, the band played around Europe while writing material in preparation for a follow-up album. As their own studios had been earmarked for demolition, the five-piece moved to Berlin to record the new album. They set up their own label and signed with Believe Recordings (UK) and released the singles "Envy" and "Got Well Soon" by the end of 2013. In early February 2014, the album War Room Stories was released.

Breton's single "Got Well Soon" was included in episode 4 of Life Is Strange, an episodic video game made by Dontnod Entertainment in 2015, as the first song played inside the Vortex Club. This caused a rise in popularity of the single. But "Edward The Confessor" was their first ever single to be included in any video game. The single was included in Sleeping Dogs, an action-adventure video game developed by United Front Games and published by Square Enix's European subsidiary in 2012 as one of the songs in the in-game "Kerrang! radio". The following year, their single "The Commission" was included in Asphalt 8: Airborne, a racing video game made by Gameloft as one of the main menu themes.

In February 2019, Rappak confirmed the splitting of the band through posts on Facebook, Twitter, and Instagram.

Band members

Final line-up
 Adam Ainger - drums 
 Roman Rappak - lead vocals, guitar 
 Daniel McIlvenny - bass guitar, keyboards, synthesizers 
 Ian Patterson - beats 
 Ryan McClarnon - visuals 

Former
 Alex Wadey

Discography

Albums

EPs
 Practical EP (Strange Torpedo, 2010)
 Sharing Notes EP (BretonLabs, 2010)
 Counter Balance EP (Hemlock Recordings, 2011)
 Blanket Rule EP (2012)
 Escalation EP (BretonLabs, 2013)
 Force of Habit EP (Cut Tooth / Believe Recordings, 2013)

Singles
Charting

Other singles
 "Edward the Confessor" (Fat Cat Records, 2011)
 "Interference" (Fat Cat Records, 2012)
 "Jostle" (Fat Cat Records, 2012)
 "Population Density" (Fat Cat Records, 2012)
 "Remixed 12"" (Fat Cat Records, 2013)
 "Got Well Soon" (Cut Tooth / Believe Recordings, 2013)
 "Envy" (Cut Tooth / Believe Recordings, 2013)

References

English indie rock groups
FatCat Records artists